Andrei Viorel Artean (born 14 August 1993) is a Romanian professional footballer who plays for as a defensive midfielder for Liga I club Farul Constanța.

Club career

ACS Poli Timișoara
After coming through the ranks for the historic FC Politehnica Timișoara, Artean moved to the club formed in 2012, renamed ACS Poli Timișoara. Having made his debut in the second league for the team in the 2012–2013 season, he was loaned out for two years to FC Caransebeș. The midfielder then returned to Poli in the summer of 2015 and played his first Liga I match against ASA Târgu Mureș.

Honours

Club

FC Caransebeș
Liga III: 2013–14

ACS Poli Timisoara
Cupa Ligii runner-up: 2016–17

Viitorul Constanța
Cupa României: 2018–19
Supercupa României: 2019

References

External links
 
 

Sportspeople from Hunedoara
Living people
1993 births
Romanian footballers
Association football midfielders
Liga I players
Liga II players
Liga III players
ACS Poli Timișoara players
SCM Râmnicu Vâlcea players
FC Viitorul Constanța players
FCV Farul Constanța players